Pavel Lukáš (born 20 November 1975) is a Czech football player.

His brother Petr Lukáš is also a professional footballer.

External links
 Profile at iDNES.cz
 Guardian Football

Czech footballers
1975 births
Living people
Czech First League players
Bohemians 1905 players
FC Hradec Králové players
FK Mladá Boleslav players
Association football defenders